Pleurotomella innocentia is a species of sea snail, a marine gastropod mollusk in the family Raphitomidae.

This species is considered by Kantor, Yuri I., and M. G. Harasewych (2013) as a synonym of  Falsimohnia minor Strebel, 1908.

Description
The length of the shell attains 4 mm. The shell is spiraled and generally a brownish or white color. It is pointed at the top.

Distribution
This marine species occurs off South Georgia Island and off Port Alfred, Rep. South Africa, and in the Ross Sea, Antarctica

References

 Dell, Richard Kenneth. "Antarctic Mollusca: with special reference to the fauna of the Ross Sea." Royal Society of New Zealand, 1990.
 Engl, W. (2012). Shells of Antarctica. Hackenheim: Conchbooks. 402 pp.

External links
 
 Bouchet P., Kantor Yu.I., Sysoev A. & Puillandre N. (2011) A new operational classification of the Conoidea. Journal of Molluscan Studies 77: 273–308
 Kantor, Yuri I., and M. G. Harasewych (2013). "Antarctica, where turrids and whelks converge: A revision of Falsimohnia Powell, 1951 (Neogastropoda: Buccinoidea) and a description of a new genus." The Nautilus 127 (2013): 43–56
 
 Kantor Y.I., Harasewych M.G. & Puillandre N. (2016). A critical review of Antarctic Conoidea (Neogastropoda). Molluscan Research. 36(3): 153–206
 Griffiths, H.J.; Linse, K.; Crame, J.A. (2003). SOMBASE - Southern Ocean mollusc database: a tool for biogeographic analysis in diversity and evolution. Organisms Diversity and Evolution. 3: 207–213.

innocentia
Gastropods described in 1990